Francis T. Lavoie (May 22, 1874 – August 26, 1947) was a Canadian politician. He served in the Legislative Assembly of New Brunswick as member of the Conservative party representing Northumberland County from 1925 to 1930.

References

20th-century Canadian politicians
1874 births
1947 deaths
Progressive Conservative Party of New Brunswick MLAs